Dalab-e Pain (also Romanized as Dālāb-e Pā‘īn; also known as Dālāb-e Soflá and Dālāb) is a village in Gol Gol Rural District, in the Central District of Kuhdasht County, Lorestan Province, Iran. At the 2006 census, its population was 186, in 38 families.

References 

Towns and villages in Kuhdasht County